The Steyr AUG is an Austrian bullpup assault rifle chambered for the 5.56×45mm NATO intermediate cartridge, designed in the 1960s by Steyr-Daimler-Puch, and now manufactured by Steyr Arms GmbH & Co KG.

It was adopted by the Austrian Army in 1978 as the StG 77 (Sturmgewehr 77), where it replaced the 7.62×51mm NATO StG 58 automatic rifle (a licence-built FN FAL). In production since 1978, it is the standard small arm of the Bundesheer and various Austrian federal police units, and its variants have also been adopted by the armed forces of dozens of countries, with some using it as a standard-issue service rifle.

Steyr AUG importation into the United States began in the 1980s as the AUG/SA (SA denoting semiautomatic). President George H.W. Bush banned the AUG via an executive order under the 1989 Assault Weapon Import Ban. Six years into the ban, AUG buyers gained a reprieve as cosmetic changes to the carbine's design allowed importation once again. Changes included the pistol grip being changed into a thumbhole stock, and the gun barrel left unthreaded to prevent attachment of flash hiders and suppressors. The ban sunsetted in 2004, and in 2008 Steyr Arms worked with Sabre Defence to produce parts legally in the U.S.

Design details
The Steyr AUG is a selective-fire, bullpup weapon with a conventional gas-piston-operated action that fires from a closed bolt. It is designed as a Modular Weapon System that could be quickly configured as a rifle, a carbine, a sniper rifle, a sub-machine gun and even an open-bolt squad automatic weapon. The AUG employs a very high level of advanced firearms technology and is made with the extensive use of polymers and aluminium components. It is chambered in 5.56×45mm NATO cartridge and has the standard 1:9 rifling twist that will stabilise both SS109/M855 and M193 rounds.

Some nations including Australia, Ireland and New Zealand use a version with a 1:7 twist optimised for the SS109 NATO round. The submachine gun variants are chambered in 9×19mm Parabellum. The AUG consists of six interchangeable assemblies: the barrel, receiver with integrated telescopic sight or Picatinny rail, bolt carrier assembly, trigger mechanism, stock and magazine.

Operating mechanism

The AUG has a rotating bolt that features 7 radial locking lugs and is unlocked by means of a pin on the bolt body and a recessed camming guide machined into the bolt carrier. The bolt carrier itself is guided by two guide rods brazed to it and these rods run inside steel bearings in the receiver. The guide rods are hollow and contain the return springs. The bolt also contains a claw extractor that forms the eighth locking lug and a spring-loaded "bump"-type casing ejector.

The gas cylinder is offset to the right side of the barrel and works with one of the two guide rods. The AUG uses a short-stroke piston system where the right guide rod serves as the action rod, transmitting the rearward motion of the gas-driven piston to the bolt carrier. The left-hand rod provides retracting handle pressure when connected by the forward assist and can also be utilised as a reamer to remove fouling in the gas cylinder. The firearm uses a 3-position gas valve. The first setting, marked with a small dot, is used for normal operation. The second setting, illustrated with a large dot, indicates fouled conditions. The third, "GR" closed position is used to launch rifle grenades (of the non-bullet trap type).

The AUG is hammer-fired and the firing mechanism is contained in the rear of the stock, near the butt, covered by a synthetic rubber shoulder plate. The hammer group is made entirely of plastics except for the springs and pins and is contained in an open-topped plastic box which lies between the magazine and the buttplate. During firing the recoiling bolt group travels over the top of it, resetting the hammer. Since the trigger is located some distance away, it transmits its energy through a sear lever which passes by the side of the magazine. The firing pin is operated by a plastic hammer under pressure from a coil spring.

Features 
The AUG comes standard with four magazines, a muzzle cap, spare bolt for left-handed shooters, blank-firing adaptor, cleaning kit, sling and either an American M7 or German KCB-77 M1 bayonet.

Muzzle devices and barrel lengths 
The flash suppressors are screwed to the muzzle and internally threaded to take a blank-firing attachment.

Trigger
The AUG features an Spz-kr type progressive trigger (pulling the trigger halfway produces semi-automatic fire, pulling the trigger all the way to the rear produces fully automatic fire) and a safety mechanism (cross-bolt, button type), located immediately above the hand grip. In its "safe" position (white dot) the trigger is mechanically disabled; pressing the safety button to the left exposes a red dot and indicates the weapon is ready to fire. Some versions have an ALO or "automatic lockout", a small projection at the base of the trigger. This was first included on the Irish Defence Forces variant of the rifle, and soon after, the Australian Defence Forces variant. In the exposed position the ALO stops the trigger being squeezed past the semi-automatic position. If needed, the ALO can be pushed up to permit automatic fire.

Ammunition feeding 
The light machine gun variant of the AUG uses an extended 42-round magazine. An Argentine variant of the FN FAL chambered in 5.56×45mm NATO cartridge and known as the FALMP III Type 2 also uses the same magazine.

Sights 
The AUG has a 1.5× telescopic sight that is integrated with the receiver casting and is made by Swarovski Optik. It contains a simple black ring reticle with a basic rangefinder that is designed so that at  a 180 cm (5 ft 11in) tall man-size target will completely fill it, giving the shooter an accurate method of estimating range. The sight cannot be set to a specific range but can be adjusted for windage and elevation for an initial zero and is designed to be calibrated for 300 m. So when it is set, aiming at the centre of a target will produce a hit at all ranges out to 300 m. It also has a backup iron sight with a rear notch and front blade, cast into the top of the aluminium optical sight housing, used in case of failure or damage to the primary optical sight. The sight is also equipped with a set of three illuminated dots (one on the front blade and two at the rear) for use in low-level lighting conditions. In order to mount a wide range of optics and accessories, a receiver with a NATO-standard Picatinny rail and detachable carrying handle was also developed and introduced in December 1997.

Engineering
The quick-change barrel used in the AUG is cold hammer-forged by GFM-GmbH of Steyr Austria for increased precision and durability, its bore, chamber and certain components of the gas system are chrome-plated (currently nitrided on US market rifles). The standard rifle-length barrel features 6 right-hand grooves and a rifling twist rate of 228 mm (1:9 in). An external sleeve is shrunk on to the barrel and carries the gas port and cylinder, gas valve and forward grip hinge jaw. There is a short cylinder which contains a piston and its associated return spring. The barrel locks into a steel insert inside the receiver through a system of eight lugs arranged around the chamber end and is equipped with a folding, vertical grip that helps to pivot and withdraw the barrel during barrel changes. The most compact of the barrels has a fixed vertical grip.

The receiver housing is a steel-reinforced aluminium extrusion finished with a baked enamel coating. It holds the steel bearings for the barrel lugs and the guide rods. The non-reciprocating plastic cocking handle works in a slot on the left side of the receiver and is connected to the bolt carrier's left guide rod. The cocking handle has a forward assist feature—alternatively called a "silent cocking device"—used for pushing the bolt shut without recocking the rifle. A bolt hold-open device locks the bolt carrier assembly back after the last round has been fired. The newer AUG A3s possess a bolt release button, prior to this development all AUGs and the USR required the cocking handle being retracted to release the bolt group after a new magazine has been inserted. Older versions of the AUG can be upgraded to use the newer A3 stock and hammer pack.

The rifle's stock is made from fibreglass-reinforced polyamide 66. At the forward end is the pistol grip with an enlarged forward trigger guard completely enclosing the firing hand that allows the rifle to be operated with winter gloves. The trigger is hung permanently on the pistol grip, together with its two operating rods which run in guides past the magazine housing. Behind that is the locking catch for the stock group. Pressing this to the right will separate the receiver and stock. The magazine catch is behind the housing, on the underside of the stock. Above the housing are the two ejector openings, one of which is always covered by a removable strip of plastic. The rear of the stock forms the actual shoulder rest which contains the hammer unit and the end of the bolt path. The butt is closed by an endplate which is held in place by the rear sling swivel. This swivel is attached to a pin which pushes in across the butt and secures the plate. There is a cavity under the buttplate that holds a cleaning kit.

Modularity

Stock 
While the AUG is not fully ambidextrous, it can still be configured to be use for left- or right-handed operators by changing the bolt with one that has the extractor and ejector on the appropriate side, and moving the blanking plate to cover the ejection port not in use. However, there exists also a right-hand-only stock that allows for the use of M16 type STANAG magazines.

Receivers 
The AUG's receiver may also be changed from the standard model with a carrying handle and built-in 1.5× optical sight, to the "T" model receiver which has a universal scope mount to allow for the use of a variety of scopes and sights. The rifle also has several different types of receivers with Picatinny rails.

Firing mechanism 
The AUG's firing mechanism may also be changed at will, into a variety of configurations, including semi-auto and full-auto, semi-auto and three-round-burst, semi-auto-only, or any other combination that the user may desire. It may also be converted into an open-bolt full-auto-only mode of fire, which allows for improved cooling and eliminates cook off problems when the AUG is used as a light machine gun or squad automatic weapon.

Barrels 
All AUGs are equipped with quick detachable barrels; including compact  barrels,  carbine barrels,  standard rifle-length barrels and  light machine gun barrels. Rifles equipped with  pattern barrels produced for military purposes are also equipped with bayonet lugs. The  and  barrels are capable of launching NATO STANAG type 22 mm rifle grenades from their integral flash hiders without the use of an adapter. AUG barrels can also mount 40 mm M203 or AG36 grenade launchers. Steyr also offers  barrel configurations fitted with a fixed, post front-sight used on the standard rifle version with aperture iron sights.

Military adoption

Australian military

The Australian Defence Force (ADF) adopted a modified Steyr AUG designated the F88 Austeyr. From the late 1980s, the F88 became the ADF's standard individual weapon replacing the L1A1 SLR and M16A1 in the Australian Army. From the mid 2010s, the Enhanced F88 (or EF88) Austeyr replaced the F88.

The F88 Austeyr was manufactured under licence from Steyr Mannlicher AG at the Lithgow Small Arms Factory, by Australian Defence Industries (ADI) which is now owned by Thales Australia. The changes made from the original Steyr AUG include a bayonet lug, a 1:7 in rifling pitch as found in the M16A2 assault rifle, optimised for the heavier 62-grain NATO-standard SS109/M855 round and an "automatic lockout" trigger that can physically disable the fully automatic position of the two-stage trigger mechanism found on the standard AUG. It had a cyclic rate of fire of around 680–850 rounds per minute and incorporated a crosshair doughnut sight.
The F88C Austeyr was the carbine variant of the F88 Austeyr that featured a shorter  barrel. It was generally used as a personal defensive weapon where manoeuvrability is an issue, such as in armoured vehicles.
The F88T Austeyr is a training rifle that is chambered in .22 Long Rifle cartridge. The rifle provides an economical training alternative, with very low ammunition cost, which can be used in environmentally sensitive training areas and ranges where "overshooting" is an issue, and there is a lower risk of injuring instructors and other persons. The F88T is used for training by the Australian Defence Force Cadets.
The F88S (Special) Austeyr was a variant of the F88 Austeyr that entered service in 1998 with an Accuracy International Mounting System (AIMS) to allow the attachment of a different sighting device.
In 2001, the Grenade Launcher Attachment (GLA) replaced the M203 grenade launcher from the M16A1 that had been fitted to the F88 and also the M79 grenade launcher. The GLA was a RM Equipment M203PI grenade launcher and a Knight's Armament quadrant sight assembly with a Firepoint red dot sight together with an Inter-bar (armourer attached) interface. The bayonet lug and forward vertical grip were removed.
The F88SA1 Austeyr was an upgrade of the F88 Austeyr that entered service in 2003. The F88SA1 had an integrated Picatinny rail in place of the standard optical sight. The rail allowed the attachment of various other sighting devices (night vision scopes, magnified and non-magnified optics such as the ELCAN C79, Trijicon ACOG or Aimpoint). The F88S was withdrawn from service.
The F88SA1C Austeyr was the carbine variant of the F88SA1 Austeyr fitted with a Picatinny rail. The rifle had a  barrel. Typically issued to front-line combat infantry units with room and weight constraints such as cavalry, Military Police, reconnaissance, light horse, paratroopers and airfield defence guards (RAAF).
The F88SA2 Austeyr was an upgrade of the F88 Austeyr that entered service in 2009 issued to units serving in the war in Afghanistan. It was withdrawn due to issues and reentered service in the end of 2010. The rifle had a two-tone colour with a "dark khaki undercarriage and a light brown upper to match" the Disruptive Pattern Desert Uniform. Design improvements included a modified gas system for increased reliability, an enlarged ejection port, a longer Picatinny Rail on top of the weapon, a modified sight housing and a side rail mount for a torch and Night Aiming Device (NAD). The F1A1 ammunition was improved to suit the F88SA2. The rifle could be fitted with a standard 1.5x sight or the Trijicon Advanced Combat Optical Gunsight (ACOG).

The Advanced Individual Combat Weapon (AICW) developed by the Defence Science and Technology Organisation was an experimental weapon combining the barrel, action and magazine of an F88 Austeyr with an enlarged receiver and stock/body that also incorporates a multiple-shot 40 mm grenade launcher.

Lithgow F90 
The Lithgow F90 was officially adopted by the Australian Defence Force in 2015, it was then designated as the Enhanced F88 (EF88) Austeyr. Its nominal cyclic rate of fire is 740 rounds per minute. The EF88 is part of the LAND 125 Soldier Combat System project and is a significant upgrade to the F88SA2. It was developed and produced at the Australian Defence Industries factory in Lithgow Small Arms Factory, which is now owned by Thales Australia to fulfil current and near future requirements for the Australian Defence Force. It was first displayed to the public in the middle of 2012 and the initial production was scheduled for 2013, its final design and testing ended later on that year. Internally and externally the EF88 is still similar to the Steyr AUG, although it has received many distinctive upgrades and changes. Upgrades include the following:
1. Length of pull has been shortened by 15 mm. (The distance between the stock backplate and the grip; too long and it becomes difficult to handle on close quarters)
2. Longer top rail and a modular lower forend with side and bottom rails.
3. Floating barrel which increases accuracy.
4. Fluted barrel which dissipates heat from automatic fire.
5. Folding charging handle.
6. Improved butt design which has increased strength and a recessed ejection port cover to improve reliability.
7. Bolt-together butt for easier disassembly.
8. Provision for electronic architecture to allow centralised control and power management of ancillary devices.
9. Primarily uses the side-loading grenade launcher (Steyr-Mannlicher SL40) which can fire all currently available 40 mm low velocity grenades.
10. Improved grenade launcher mount which improves the balance of the weapon.
11. Improved grenade launcher safety, the new KORD RIC (Rifle Input Control) electronic control system made by Thales will also be integrated into the rifle.

In June 2012, Thales debuted the F90 at the Eurosatory military exhibition in Paris. Thales in partnership with Steyr-Mannlicher are pursuing small arms procurement programs such as the planned replacement of FAMAS used by the French military. Low Rate Initial Production of the F90 began in September 2014.

Thales tested the Madritsch ML40AUS grenade launcher a derivative of the ML40 designed specifically for the F90. The ML40AUS is one of the lightest underbarrel grenade launchers at less than  due to steel, aluminium, and synthetic parts. The ML40AUS was mounted on the rifle's bottom accessory rail with the trigger moving through a removable plug in the trigger guard that allows for operation of the launcher inside of it, moving it further back than other launchers to maintain centre of balance and improve handling. The ML40AUS differed from the M203 by having a side-opening breech to allow for longer grenade rounds, a cross-bolt safety, and a new quadrant sight that mounts to the top rail alongside the rifle's optics. On 21 January 2014 however, Thales announced they had instead selected the Steyr SL40 grenade launcher due to "significant" engineering concerns with the ML40AUS. The SL40 is a derivative of the Steyr GL40 launcher designed specifically for the EF88. Though marginally heavier than the ML40AUS, it has the same attachment, firing mechanism, and control layout.

Within the Australian Defence Force, there has been some discussion about the suitability of the EF88 when compared against variants of the M4 such as the MCX.

Dasan Manufacturing (now part of SNT Motiv) was granted the rights to manufacture them in 2017 in an effort to bid them to the South Korean military for future replacements of the Daewoo K2. At the Defexpo 2018 convention, MKU has Indian licensing rights to manufacture the F90 for Indian contracts. In April 2019, the F90CQB variant was planned to be submitted in conjunction with the Kalyani Group for Indian Army requirements on a 5.56 mm NATO carbine. As of April 2020, Bharat Forge is Thales' partner to manufacture the F90.

The rifle can also be fitted with the SL40 underbarrel grenade launcher.

F90 ATRAX is a planned semi-automatic only variant of the F90 intended for the American civilian market. It was announced by Thales that plans to release the rifle will be discontinued for "ethical reasons."

Austrian military 

The Austrian Army adopted the Steyr AUG in 1978 and designated it as the Sturmgewehr 77 (StG 77).

The StG 77 is the Austrian Army's designation for the Steyr AUG.
The StG 77 A2 is the Austrian Army's designation for the Steyr AUG A3 SF. It was adopted by the Austrian Special Forces (Jagdkommando) in late 2007.
The StG 77 KPE is the Austrian Army's designation for an upgraded StG 77. Where the A1 housing group was replaced with the A3 SF housing and was adopted in 2017.
The StG 77 A1 MP is the Austrian Army designation for the StG 77 used by military police. The rifles differ from the standard StG 77 by having a Picatinny rail for an Aimpoint Micro T1 and red dot magnifier, a flash hider from Ase-Utra, and Rheinmetall Vario Ray laser and light module mounted on the right side. Adopted in 2018.

Irish military 

The Steyr AUG Mod 14 is an AUG A1 upgraded by the Irish Army, which was possible due to the modularity of the rifle. It allowed the Irish Army to make modernisation upgrades. They replaced the original A1 housing/receiver group (with 1.5× optical sight) with an A3 housing/receiver group (with MIL-STD-1913 Picatinny rail on top and right side) allowing a modern optical sight to be fitted. The Trijicon ACOG 4× sight was selected as the new optical sight of the rifle. The rifle features the ALO "automatic lockout" trigger, which can also be found in the Australian and New Zealand versions. In 2014, they began issuing the rifle to its operational units.

New Zealand military 

The New Zealand Defence Force had adopted the F88 Austeyr and designated it as the IW Steyr (Individual Weapon Steyr). However the New Zealand Defence Force has since adopted the Lewis Machine and Tool, Mars-L 5.56mm rifle and phased out the IW Steyr.
New Zealand variants of the Steyr were equipped with a single-stage trigger and a two-position safety. The sight added a crosshair to the circle reticule. New Zealand issued both factory and locally modified carbines alongside the full-length rifle variant.

Variants

AUG 
The Steyr AUG is a bullpup assault rifle chambered in 5.56×45mm NATO. It was introduced in 1978 and was adopted by the Austrian Army and was designated as the StG 77 in 1978, then it was later adopted by several military agencies around the world.

The Steyr AUG A1 is an improved variant of the AUG and was introduced in 1982. It is available with a choice of olive or black furniture.
The Steyr AUG M203 is an AUG A1 fitted with the M203 grenade launcher.
The Steyr AUG AG-C is an AUG A1 fitted with the AG-C grenade launcher.
The Steyr AUG A2 features a redesigned charging handle and a detachable telescopic sight which can be replaced with a MIL-STD-1913 rail. Due to its modularity, a 24-inch barrel can be used and a Picatinny rail section can be fitted instead of the folding grip, where a bipod can be installed. The rifle was introduced in December 1997.
The Steyr AUG A3 features a MIL-STD-1913 rail on top of the receiver and an external bolt release.
The Steyr AUG A3 SF features an MIL-STD-1913 rails mounted on the telescopic sight and on the right side of the receiver, and includes an external bolt release. The integrated telescopic sight is offered in 1.5× or 3× magnification.
The Steyr AUG A3-CQC was a prototype development of the AUG A3 and was first displayed by Steyr at the SHOT Show 2006. It differs in having a railed handguard attached ahead of the receiver. Due to the need to remove this extra railed section in order to strip the rifle for cleaning, it featured a quick detach lever mounted on the left side to remove the rail. Due to the concerns over the extra cost and weight, along with potential issues with the reliability and consistency of the detachable handguard, the prototypes received little interest and were last seen promoted by Steyr in 2008 and likely has been cancelled. In total only 5 prototypes were made, four with standard 18-inch barrels, and one with a longer heavy marksman barrel and a 20-round magazine. In 2012 the American company PJA obtained the 5 original prototypes from Steyr and reverse engineered them in order to produce a US-made AUG A3-CQC and conversion kits.

AUG HBAR 
The Steyr AUG HBAR (Heavy Barreled Automatic Rifle) is a longer heavier-barreled variant of the standard AUG for use as a light machine gun or squad automatic weapon. It uses the standard AUG receiver with 1.5× magnification scope. It can be modified to fire from an open bolt to allow sustained fire. To accomplish this, a modified bolt carrier, striker and trigger mechanism with sear are used.

The Steyr AUG HBAR-T (Heavy Barreled Automatic Rifle-Telescope) is a designated marksman configuration of the HBAR that features a special receiver with a STANAG scope mount system usually fitted with a Schmidt & Bender 4x25, or a Kahles ZF69 6×42 optical sight.

AUG Para 

The Steyr AUG Para also known as the AUG SMG or AUG 9mm, is a submachine gun variant of the AUG chambered in 9×19mm Parabellum cartridge and has been produced since 1988. It differs from the rifle variants by having a different barrel, bolt and magazine. It is an automatic, blowback-operated model that fires from a closed bolt, and does not use the rifle's gas system. Unlike the rifle variants, it has a unique  barrel with six right-hand grooves at a 250 mm (1:9.8 in) rifling twist rate, with a recoil compensator, a slightly different charging handle and a magazine well adapter enabling the use of proprietary 25-round box magazines. The original design of the AUG 9mm, known as the MP88, used Steyr MPi 69 magazines. A conversion kit used to transform any assault rifle configuration into the submachine gun configuration is also available. The conversion kit consists of a barrel, bolt, adapter insert and magazine.
The Steyr AUG A3 Para XS is a 9mm variant of the AUG A3. It features a  barrel and a Picatinny rail system.
The Steyr AUG 40 is a .40 S&W variant of the AUG Para that uses Glock compatible double stack .40 S&W magazines.

Civilian variants 

 The Steyr AUG P is a semi-automatic only variant of the AUG A1, available to the civilian and law enforcement markets. It features a shorter,  barrel and a modified bolt, carrier and trigger assembly that will only allow semi-automatic fire. The rifle also has a slightly different optical sight that features a reticule with a fine dot in the centre of the aiming circle, allowing for more precise aiming.
The Steyr AUG P Special Receiver is similar to the AUG P but features a STANAG scope mount system on top of the receiver.
The Steyr AUG SA is a semi-automatic only variant of the AUG A1; built for civilian use and import to the US before being banned from importation in 1989.
The Steyr AUG Z is a semi-automatic only variant in compliance with Austrian weapon laws, somewhat similar to the AUG A2 but lacking the quick detachable barrels and is unable to accept the trigger group from the assault rifles. It is intended primarily for civilian use.
The Steyr AUG Z Sport is a semi-automatic only variant, somewhat similar to the AUG Z for use in sport shooting approved by the BKA in Germany. This variant has a special handguard without the typical front grip.
The Steyr AUG Z SP was a straight pull only configuration, somewhat similar to the AUG Z and was intended primarily for civilian use; it was sold only in the United Kingdom.
The Steyr AUG Z A3 is a semi-automatic only variant of the AUG Z similar to the AUG A3, and was introduced in 2010.
The Steyr AUG Z A3 9mm is a semi-automatic only 9×19mm Parabellum variant of the AUG Z A3.
The Steyr AUG Z A3 SE is a semi-automatic only variant of the AUG Z similar to the AUG A3 SF.
The Steyr USR is an AUG A2 modified to meet the former Federal Assault Weapons Ban (AWB) (or Public Safety and Recreational Firearms Use Protection Act) regulations. The primary difference is the omission of the flash hider.
The Steyr AUG A3 SA USA is a semi-automatic only variant of the AUG A3 with a  barrel, made available for the U.S. civilian market in April 2009.
The Steyr AUG A3 SA NATO: Similar to the AUG A3 SA USA but uses a right-hand-only, NATO STANAG magazine stock assembly.
The Steyr AUG A3 M1 is a semi-automatic only variant of the AUG A3 SF with a detachable optical sight which can be replaced with MIL-STD-1913 rails, manufactured in the US by Steyr Arms since October 2014.

AUG clones
The STG-556 was introduced at the 2007 SHOT Show, it was manufactured by Microtech Small Arms Research Inc. (a subsidiary of Microtech Knives) an AUG A1 clone significantly re-engineered in its working system and principle as it features a bolt hold-open device as seen on the M16 rifle; otherwise the MSAR STG-556 retains the original AUG features, such as feeding from proprietary translucent plastic magazines and having the quick-change barrel option. The STG-556 can be converted from either having a telescopic sight or a MIL-STD-1913 rail. It is available in either civilian (semi-automatic only) configuration, and military and law enforcement (selective fire) configuration.
The AXR was revealed at the 2007 SHOT Show, the TPD USA AXR was manufactured by Tactical Products Design Inc. as an AUG A2 clone capable of semi-automatic only fire, aimed for both the civilian and law enforcement markets, and fed by STANAG magazines; the manufacturer sells clear plastic magazines which are STANAG 4179 compliant and will readily fit in any rifle with a compatible magazine catch. The rifle does not have the integral scope, allowing users to use any kind of scopes or laser sights on the Picatinny railing.
The Type 68 is a Taiwanese copy of the AUG with notable differences including a smaller trigger guard and the use of iron sights instead of the original's telescopic sight (although optical sights can still be optionally mounted on the carrying handle). Developed as a potential alternative to the T65 assault rifle and (in the form of a heavy-barrel variant) replacement to the Type 57A squad automatic rifle (licence-built selective fire M14A1), it ultimately did not enter service after the ROC military decided to adopt light machineguns (Minimi and T75) as their future squad automatic weapons.

Conflicts

The Steyr AUG has been used in the following conflicts:
Gulf War
Somali Civil War (by Unified Task Force, 1993)
 1999 and 2006 East Timorese crises
 Militias-Comando Vermelho Conflict
 Syrian Civil War
 War in Iraq
 Papua conflict
 2022 Russian invasion of Ukraine

Users

Military 
 : Special Intervention Detachment
 : Argentine Armed Forces.
 : A variant, the Austeyr F88, is the standard rifle of the Australian Defence Force. It is manufactured, under licence from Steyr-Mannlicher, by Thales Australia. The Austeyr entered service in January 1989, replacing both the M16A1 and the L1A1 Self Loading Rifle used by the Australian Army. The first regular unit to be issued with the Austeyr was 6 RAR, which received them in January 1989.
 : Standard weapon of the Bundesheer, serving as the StG 77 in official army nomenclature.
 
 
 
 : Used by the Croatian Special Forces.
 
 
 
 : Used by Komando Pasukan Katak (Kopaska) tactical diver group and Komando Pasukan Khusus (Kopassus) special forces group.
 : Standard service rifle of the Irish Defence Forces. The Army Ranger Wing special forces uses the Steyr AUG A2 and A3.
 : Carabinieri Special Forces: Gruppo di Intervento Speciale and 1st "Tuscania" Regiment
 : Standard infantry rifle of the Luxembourg Army. The HBAR variant is also employed as the section support weapon.
 : Made under license from Steyr by SME Ordnance. Local production of the AUG rifle series started in 1991 with a joint production with Steyr that started in 2004. Lawsuits from Steyr emerged when Malaysia decided to withdraw from joint production.
 
 : Used from 1988 until 2019. The first 5,000 weapons delivered were manufactured in Austria by Steyr Daimler Puch. Latter versions were the Australian ADI-made Austeyr F88 variant, locally designated IW Steyr (Individual Weapon Steyr.) From August 2015 the Lewis Machine Tools 5.56 mm MARS-L started to replace the Steyr AUG.
 
 
 : F88 variant.
 : Used by the Scout Rangers.
 : JW Grom special forces group.
 : Used by the Romanian Special Forces
 
 : 72nd Reconnaissance-Commando Battalion.
  Type 68 copy
 : The Steyr AUG has been the primary weapon of the Tunisian Army since 1978. The first regular unit to be issued with the AUG A1 was the GTS. Subsequently, the leadership began arming the National Guard with Sturmgewehr 58 (FN FAL) and the army with the AUG A1/A2/A3 variants, including the Army's Special Forces.
 : Maroon Berets.
 : AUG HBAR is used by the Sokil Special Forces.
 
 : Falkland Islands Defence Force. Being replaced by the L85A2.
 : Received 15,000 Steyr AUG A2UR bullpup assault rifles (with the 1.5× telescopic sight) to be used by the Uruguayan infantry battalions.

 Law enforcement 
 : Formerly used by the Victoria Police Special Operations Group, replaced by the M4 Carbine in the 2000s.
 : Used by EKO Cobra.
 : Steyr AUG Para is used by the Federal Police.
 : In use by Agência Brasileira de Inteligência since November 2011. SMG version adopted by São Paulo Police in .40 S&W.
 : SOBT (counter-terrorist unit) only.
 : Steyr AUG Carbine in 9×19mm Parabellum used by several Czech police units (as of 2011).
 : Bavarian SEK.
 : Used by the Mobile Brigade Corps (Brimob) special forces group of the Indonesian National Police, including Detachment 88 counter-terrorist unit.
 : The Unité Spéciale de la Police intervention unit of the Grand Ducal Police employs the AUG A2 variant.
 : Used by 69 Commando of Pasukan Gerakan Khas counter-terrorist unit of the Royal Malaysia Police.
 : National Police of East Timor
 : Police Special Operations Department.
 : U.S. Immigration and Customs Enforcement, replaced by the Colt M4.
 : Used by SEBIN.

 Non-state 
 : used by the Military of IS.
 : Origin unclear; serial numbers removed. Used by Syrian Opposition special forces.
 : Likely captured or bought from Indonesian forces

See also
List of assault rifles
List of bullpup firearms

References

Bibliography
 

External links

Steyr Mannlicher—military and law enforcement
Steyr AUG A3
Steyr AUG 9mm
Operators manual – Steyr-Mannlicher
REMTEK
Modern Firearms – Steyr AUG
"Australia ready to sign EF88 Austeyr rifle contract" by Julian Kerr, IHS Jane's Defence Weekly''
MSAR STG-556 Pictorial

.300 BLK firearms
5.56×45mm NATO assault rifles
Bullpup rifles
Designated marksman rifles
Light machine guns
Machine guns of Austria
Assault rifles of Austria
Steyr
Submachine guns of Austria
Weapons and ammunition introduced in 1978
Modular firearms
Short stroke piston firearms